Aghaderg is a civil parish in County Down, Northern Ireland. It is situated in mainly in the historic barony of Iveagh Upper, Upper Half, with some areas in the baronies of Iveagh Lower, Lower Half (2 townlands) and Iveagh Upper, Lower Half (1 townland).

Settlements
The civil parish contains the following settlements:
Loughbrickland
Poyntzpass
Scarva

Townlands
Aghaderg civil parish contains the following townlands:

Ballintaggart
Ballygowan
Ballynaskeagh
Ballyvarley
Bovennett
Brickland
Carrickdrumman
Caskum
Coolnacran
Creevy
Derrydrummock
Dromorebrague
Drummiller
Drumnahare
Drumsallagh
Edenderry
Glaskerbeg East
Glaskerbeg West
Glaskermore
Glenloughan
Greenan
Legananny
Lisnabrague
Lisnagade
Lisnagonnell
Lisnatierny
Loughadian
Meenan
Scarva
Shankill

See also
List of civil parishes of County Down

References